If I Was: The Very Best of Midge Ure & Ultravox is a 1993 compilation album by Scottish musician Midge Ure, featuring songs from his solo career and as part of the new wave and synthpop band Ultravox, along with Ure's collaborations with Mick Karn ("After a Fashion"), Phil Lynott ("Yellow Pearl"), Visage ("Fade to Grey"), and charity supergroup Band Aid ("Do They Know It's Christmas?").

Track listing

Personnel
Adapted from AllMusic.

Ultravox – performer, primary artist, producer
Midge Ure – guitar, instrumentation, keyboards, performer, primary artist, producer, remixing, vocals
Barry Adamson – bass
Craig Armstrong – piano
Chris Ballin – background vocals
Band Aid – primary artist
Gary Barnacle – brass, horn
Angie Brown – background vocals
Mark Brzezicki – drums
Steve Brzezicki – bass
Billy Burrie – keyboards, violin
Kate Bush – guest artist, vocals
Ali Campbell – vocals
Robin Campbell	– vocals
Warren Cann – drums
Jackie Challenor – background vocals
The Chieftains – guest artist
Chris Cross – bass
Sheilah Cuffy – background vocals
Carol Douet – background vocals
Yona Dunsford – background vocals
Gwen Dupree – background vocals
Rusty Egan – drums
Lindsey Elliott – drums
Geoff Emerick – engineer
Dave Formula – keyboards
Phil Gannon – background vocals
Glenn Gregory – background vocals
Bruce Harris – executive producer, producer
Trevor Ray Hart – photography
John Hudson – engineer, producer
Kenny Hyslop – drums, percussion
Sylvia Mason-James – background vocals
Lorenza Johnson – background vocals
Mick Karn – bass, primary artist, producer
Carol Kenyon – background vocals
Robbie Kilgore	– keyboards
Mark King – bass
Maxwell Langdown – speech/speaker/speaking part, voices
Phil Lynott – guest artist, performer, primary artist, producer
George Martin – producer
Glen Matlock – bass, vocals
Michael McCloud – background vocals
John McGeoch – guitar
Jim McGinlay – bass
Billy McIsaac – keyboards, vocals
Mae McKenna – background vocals
Ian McLagan – guest artist, piano
Jeremy Meehan – bass
Paddy Moloney – tin whistle, uilleann pipes, whistle
Paul Mosby – mizmar, synthesizer
Steve New – guitar, vocals
Simon Phillips – drums
Josh Phillips-Gorse – keyboards, mellophonium, Mellotron
Conny Plank – producer
Kevin Powell – bass
Nigel Ross-Scott – bass
Vicki St. James – background vocals
Jackie Sheridan – background vocals
Peter Sherrard	– photography
Kate Stephenson – background vocals
Steve Strange – guest artist, vocals
John Thirkell – brass
Peter Thoms – brass
Vincent M. Vero – project coordinator, research
Visage – performer, primary artist, producer
Rick Walton – engineer, producer
Ricci P. Washington – background vocals
Derek Watkins – brass
Steve Williams	– electronic percussion, percussion
Kit Woolven – producer

Charts and certifications

Weekly charts

Certifications

References

External links
If I Was: The Very Best of Midge Ure & Ultravox at Discogs

Midge Ure albums
1993 compilation albums
Ultravox compilation albums
Chrysalis Records compilation albums
Albums produced by George Martin
Albums produced by Conny Plank
Albums produced by Midge Ure